Fairview is a town in Richland County, Montana, United States. The population was 896 at the 2020 census. The town is directly on the North Dakota border. Fairview incorporated in 1913.

Geography
Fairview is located at  (47.851794, -104.048499).

Demographics

2010 census
As of the census of 2010, there were 840 people, 354 households, and 217 families living in the town. The racial makeup of the town was 95.5% White, 0.2% African American, 1.7% Native American, 1.4% from other races, and 1.2% from two or more races. Hispanic or Latino of any race were 3.3% of the population.

There were 354 households, of which 32.8% had children under the age of 18 living with them, 42.9% were married couples living together, 11.3% had a female householder with no husband present, 7.1% had a male householder with no wife present, and 38.7% were non-families. 33.3% of all households were made up of individuals, and 13.6% had someone living alone who was 65 years of age or older. The average household size was 2.37 and the average family size was 3.02.

The median age in the town was 37.8 years. 26.7% of residents were under the age of 18; 7.5% were between the ages of 18 and 24; 26.1% were from 25 to 44; 24.7% were from 45 to 64; and 15.1% were 65 years of age or older. The gender makeup of the town was 51.4% male and 48.6% female.

2000 census
As of the census of 2000, there were 709 people, 310 households, and 184 families living in the town. The population density was 736.4 people per square mile (285.2/km2). There were 390 housing units at an average density of 405.1 per square mile (156.9/km2). The racial makeup of the town was 96.47% White, 0.85% Native American, 0.99% from other races, and 1.69% from two or more races. Hispanic or Latino of any race were 2.40% of the population.

There were 310 households, out of which 29.0% had children under the age of 18 living with them, 47.4% were married couples living together, 7.7% had a female householder with no husband present, and 40.6% were non-families. 38.7% of all households were made up of individuals, and 18.7% had someone living alone who was 65 years of age or older. The average household size was 2.29 and the average family size was 3.09.

In the town, the population was spread out, with 27.5% under the age of 18, 6.1% from 18 to 24, 26.7% from 25 to 44, 22.6% from 45 to 64, and 17.2% who were 65 years of age or older. The median age was 39 years. For every 100 females there were 102.0 males. For every 100 females age 18 and over, there were 94.0 males.

The median income for a household in the town was $26,023, and the median income for a family was $33,125. Males had a median income of $24,000 versus (?) females. The per capita income for the town was $13,235. About 11.1% of families and 15.7% of the population were below the poverty line, including 16.6% of those under age 18 and 13.5% of those age 65 or over.

Education
Fairview provides education from kindergarten through 12th grade. Fairview High School's team name is the Warriors.

References

External links
 Fairview Chamber of Commerce website

Towns in Richland County, Montana
Populated places established in 1913
1913 establishments in Montana